Franco Cortinovis (born 24 March 1945) is an Italian racing cyclist. He won stage 6 of the 1969 Giro d'Italia.

References

External links
 

1945 births
Living people
Italian male cyclists
Italian Giro d'Italia stage winners
Place of birth missing (living people)
Cyclists from Milan